McCoy Tyner Plays John Coltrane: Live at the Village Vanguard is a live album by McCoy Tyner released on the Impulse! label in 2001. It was recorded in September 1997 at the Village Vanguard in New York City and features performances by Tyner with bassist George Mraz and drummer Al Foster. The repertoire features compositions by John Coltrane and two others which his Quartet performed. The Allmusic review by Jonathan Widran states: "The show on September 23, 1997, was to celebrate Coltrane's 71st birthday, and this recording brings listeners so joyfully close that they can almost blow out the candles themselves". The music was recorded directly to a 2-track analogue tape with no mixing or editing.

Track listing 
All compositions by John Coltrane, except where noted.
 "Naima" - 12:17  
 "Moment's Notice" - 7:07  
 "Crescent" - 12:27  
 "After the Rain" - 3:46  
 "Afro Blue" (Mongo Santamaría) - 12:18  
 "I Want to Talk About You" (Billy Eckstine) - 11:08  
 "Mr. Day" - 7:20

Personnel 
 McCoy Tyner - piano
 George Mraz - bass
 Al Foster - drums

References 

2001 live albums
McCoy Tyner live albums
Impulse! Records live albums
Albums recorded at the Village Vanguard
John Coltrane tribute albums